Judson Allen (April 3, 1797 – August 6, 1880) was an American businessman and politician, who served as a member of the United States House of Representatives for New York's 20th district.

Biography
Allen was born in Plymouth, Connecticut, and attended the public schools there. He married Roena Badger, daughter of Lemuel Badger and Sabra Smith, in 1825. Roena died on December 2, 1830, and he married her sister, Sabra Badger, on 4 June 1835.

Career
Allen was engaged in the lumber industry in Plymouth, before he moved to Harpursville, New York.  He started his public life in earnest there, becoming the Harpursville postmaster from 1830 to 1839, a judge in the Broome County, New York court for 8 years, and a member of the New York State Assembly from 1836 to 1837.

In 1839, Allen was elected on the Democratic ticket to the United States House of Representatives for the twentieth district of New York for the twenty-sixth United States Congress. He served from March 3, 1839 to March 3, 1841.

Upon leaving the Congress, Allen moved to Saint Louis, Missouri, where he was actively involved in the produce, lumber, marble, and grocery fields.

Death
Allen died in St. Louis, Missouri, on August 6, 1880 (age 83 years, 125 days). He is interred at Bellefontaine Cemetery, St. Louis, Missouri.

References

External links
Who Was Who in America, Historical Volume, 1607-1896. Chicago: Marquis Who's Who, 1967.

1797 births
1880 deaths
People from Plymouth, Connecticut
Politicians from Binghamton, New York
Democratic Party members of the New York State Assembly
New York (state) postmasters
New York (state) state court judges
Politicians from St. Louis
Democratic Party members of the United States House of Representatives from New York (state)
People from Colesville, New York
19th-century American politicians
19th-century American judges
Burials at Bellefontaine Cemetery